Jubilee Life Insurance Company, commonly known as Jubilee Life, is a Pakistani life insurance company which is a subsidiary of Swiss for-profit organization Aga Khan Fund for Economic Development. It is based in Karachi, Pakistan.

It is the largest and the most profitable among private insurance companies in Pakistan.

History
The company was founded in 1995 as Commercial Union Life Assurance Company and was later renamed as New Jubilee Life Insurance Company Limited.

In 2002, the Aga Khan Fund for Economic Development acquired the shares from CGU International Insurance plc.

In 2011, the company rebranded from New Jubilee Insurance to Jubilee Life Insurance.

In 2015, Jubilee Life entered Takaful insurance market in Pakistan.

On July 29, 2020, Jubilee Life was awarded the Effie Award in the Insurance Category. This is the first time any insurance company has won the award in this category.

References

Aga Khan Development Network
 Pakistani subsidiaries of foreign companies
 Companies listed on the Pakistan Stock Exchange
 Insurance companies of Pakistan
 Companies based in Karachi
 Financial services companies established in 1995
 Pakistani companies established in 1995